Jack Stefanowski (born March 26, 1975) is a Polish-born American soccer manager, formally head coach of the Nepal national football team and the former interim head coach of Puerto Rico national football team, also having coached various clubs in Puerto Rico.

Stefanowski is a certified coach with UEFA and other football governing bodies.

Career
Jack Stefanowski was born in Poland and raised in New York on 26 March 1975.

Stefanowski graduated from New York University (NYU) in 1997 with a B.S. in physical therapy. He played for New York Wolfpacks Weston, Irish Rovers SC, Brooklyn Knights and Istria SC. At professional level, he played for Long Island Rough Riders and was an assistant coach for the Puerto Rico Islanders  squad that reached the semi-finals of the CONCACAF Champions League.

Coaching career
Stefanowski has 14 years of coaching experience, from college to professional level.

In February 2018, Stefanowski was brought on as an assistant/goalkeeping coach for the Washington Spirit in the NWSL, taking over for Nikki Wright.

References

10. https://web.archive.org/web/20141027192322/http://hamrofootball.com/uncategorized/interview-with-nepals-coach-jack-stefanowski-5300/

External links
Associated Sports Management profile of Jack Stefanowski

Living people
American soccer coaches
American expatriate soccer coaches
American people of Polish descent
Polish football managers
Polish expatriate football managers
Expatriate football managers in Nepal
Nepal national football team managers
1975 births
New York University alumni
American expatriate sportspeople in Nepal
Polish expatriate sportspeople in Nepal